The partially successful conquest of Central Asia by the Russian Empire took place in the second half of the nineteenth century. The land that became Russian Turkestan and later Soviet Central Asia is now divided between Kazakhstan in the north, Uzbekistan across the center, Kyrgyzstan in the east, Tajikistan in the southeast, and Turkmenistan in the southwest. The area was called Turkestan because most of its inhabitants spoke Turkic languages with the exception of Tajikistan, which speaks an Iranian language.

Outline
In the eighteenth century the Russian Empire gained increasing control over the Kazakh Steppe. The Russian conquest of Central Asia took place over several decades. In 1839 Russia failed to conquer the Khanate of Khiva south of the Aral Sea. In 1847–53 the Russians built a line of forts from the north side of the Aral Sea eastward up the Syr Darya river. In 1847–64 they crossed the eastern Kazakh Steppe and built a line of forts along the northern border of Kyrgyzstan. In 1864–68 they moved south from Kyrgyzstan, captured Tashkent and Samarkand and dominated the Khanates of Kokand and Bokhara. The next step was to turn this triangle into a rectangle by crossing the Caspian Sea. In 1873 the Russians conquered Khiva, and in 1881 they took western Turkmenistan. In 1884 they took the Merv oasis and eastern Turkmenistan. In 1885 further expansion south toward Afghanistan was blocked by the British. In 1893–95 the Russians occupied the high Pamir Mountains in the southeast.

Geography

The area was bounded on the west by the Caspian Sea, on the north by the Siberian forests and on the east by the mountains along the former Sino-Soviet border. The southern border was political rather than natural. On the east side two mountain ranges project into the desert. Between them is the well-populated Fergana Valley which is approximately the "notch" on the west side of Kyrgyzstan. North of this projection the mountain-steppe boundary extends along the north border of Kyrgyzstan about  before the mountains turn north again.

Rainfall decreases from north to south. Dense population, and therefore cities and organized states, requires irrigation. Streams coming down from the eastern mountains support a fairly dense population, especially in the Ferghana Valley. There is a line of oases along the Persian border. The interior is watered by three great rivers.  The Oxus or Amu Darya rises on the Afghan border and flows northwest into the Aral Sea, forming a large delta which was ruled by the Khanate of Khiva and has a long history under the name of Khwarezm.  The Jaxartes or Syr Darya rises in the Ferghana Valley and flows northwest and then west to meet the northeast corner of the Aral Sea. Between them is the less-famous Zarafshan River which dries up before reaching the Oxus. It waters the great cities of Bokhara and Tamerlane's old capital of Samarkand.

The deserts in the south have enough grass to support a thin nomadic population. The Kyzylkum Desert is between the Oxus and Jaxartes. The Karakum Desert is southwest of the Oxus in Turkmenistan. Between the Aral and Caspian Seas is the thinly-populated Ustyurt Plateau.

When the Russians arrived the organized states were the Khanate of Khiva in the Oxus delta south of the Aral Sea, the Khanate of Bukhara along the Oxus and Zarafshan and the Khanate of Kokand based in the Ferghana Valley. Bokhara had borders with the other two and all three were surrounded by nomads which the Khanates tried to control and tax.

Early contacts

Siberia: Russians first came into contact with Central Asia when, in 1582–1639, Cossack adventurers made themselves masters of the Siberian forests. They did not expand south because they were seeking furs. The Siberian Cossacks were skilled in forest travel and knew little of the steppe and since the forest tribes were few and weak while the steppe nomads were numerous and warlike. See Siberian River Routes and linked articles.

Up the Irtysh River: The Irtysh River rises in what is now China and flows northwest to the Russian base at Tobolsk (founded in 1587).  It was thought possible to ascend this river and reach the riches of China and India. In 1654 Fyodor Baykov used this route to reach Peking.  The main advance was made under Peter the Great.  Some time before 1714 Colonel Bukhholts and 1500 men went upriver to a ‘Lake Yamysh’ and returned. In 1715 Bukhholts with 3000 men and 1500 soldiers went to Lake Yamysh again and started to build a fort. Since this was on the fringe of the Dzungar Khanate, the Dzungars drove them off. They retreated downriver and founded Omsk.  In 1720 Ivan Likharev went upriver and founded Ust-Kamenogorsk.  The Dzungars, having just been weakened by the Chinese, left them alone. Several other places were built on the Irtysh at about this time.

The Kazakh steppe: Since the Kazakhs were nomads they could not be conquered in the normal sense. Instead Russian power slowly increased. See History of Kazakhstan.

Around the southern Urals: In 1556 Russia conquered the Astrakhan Khanate on the north shore of the Caspian Sea. The surrounding area was held by the Nogai Horde.To the east of the Nogais were the Kazakhs and to the north, between the Volga and Urals, were the Bashkirs. Around this time some free Cossacks had established themselves on the Ural River. In 1602 they captured Konye-Urgench in Khivan territory.  Returning laden with loot they were surrounded by the Khivans and slaughtered. A second expedition lost its way in the snow, starved, and the few survivors were enslaved by the Khivans. There seems to have been a third expedition which is ill-documented.

At the time of Peter the Great there was a major push southeast. In addition to the Irtysh expeditions above there was the disastrous 1717 attempt to conquer Khiva.  Following the Russo-Persian War (1722–1723) Russia briefly occupied the west side of the Caspian Sea.

About 1734 another move was planned, which provoked the Bashkir War (1735–1740).  Once Bashkiria was pacified, Russia's southeastern frontier was the Orenburg line roughly between the Urals and the Caspian Sea.

The area remained quiet for about a hundred years. In 1819 Nikolai Muraviev traveled from the Caspian Sea and contacted the Khan of Khiva.

The Siberian line: By the late eighteenth century Russia held a line of forts roughly along the current Kazakhstan border, which is approximately the boundary between forest and steppe.  For reference these forts (and foundation dates) were:

Guryev (1645), Uralsk (1613), Orenburg (1743), Orsk (1735). Troitsk (1743), Petropavlovsk (1753), Omsk (1716), Pavlodar (1720), Semipalitinsk (1718) Ust-Kamenogorsk (1720).

Uralsk was an old settlement of free Cossacks. Orenburg, Orsk and Troitsk were founded as a result of the Bashkir War about 1740 and this section was called the Orenburg line. Orenburg was long the base from which Russia watched and tried to control the Kazakh steppe. The four eastern forts were along the Irtysh River. After China conquered Xinjiang in 1759 both empires had a few border posts near the current border.

1718–1847: Gaining control of the Kazakh Steppe

Initial contacts
Since the Kazakhs were nomads they could not be conquered in the normal sense. Instead Russian control slowly increased.

Although the Sunni Muslim Kazakhs had numerous settlements near the Kazakh-Russian border, and although they conducted frequent raids on Russian territory, the Tsardom of Russia only initiated contact with them in 1692 when Peter I met with Tauke Muhammad Khan.  The Russians slowly began building trading posts along the Kazakh-Russian border over the next 20 years, gradually encroaching into Kazakh territory and displacing the locals.

Interactions intensified in 1718 during the reign of Kazakh ruler Abu'l-Khair Muhammed Khan, who initially requested the Russians to provide the Kazakh Khanate protection from the rising Dzungar Khanate to the east.  Abu'l-Khair's son, Nur Ali Khan broke the alliance in 1752 and decided to wage war on Russia, while taking the help of the famous Kazakh commander Nasrullah Nauryzbai Bahadur.  The rebellion against Russian encroachment went largely in vain, as the Kazakh troops were defeated on the battlefield numerous times.  Nur Ali Khan then agreed to re-join Russian protection with his division of the khanate, the Junior jüz, being autonomous.

By 1781, Abu'l-Mansur Khan, who ruled the Middle jüz division of the Kazakh Khanate, also entered the sphere of Russian influence and protection.  Like his predecessor Abu'l-Khair, Abu'l-Mansur also sought better protection against the Qing.  He united all three of the Kazakh jüzes and helped them all gain protection under the Russian Empire.  During this time, Abu'l-Mansur also made Nasrullah Nauryzbai Bahadur one of his three standard-bearers in the Kazakh army.  These moves allowed the Russians to penetrate further into the Central Asian heartland and interact with other Central Asian states.

Fall of the Kazakh Khanate (1847)
By 1837, tensions were rising in the Kazakh steppe once again.  This time, the tensions were started by Kazakh co-rulers Ğubaidullah Khan, Sher Ghazi Khan, and Kenesary Khan, all of whom were sons of Qasim Sultan and grandsons of Abu'l-Mansur Khan. They launched a rebellion against Russia. The three co-rulers wanted to restore the relative independence that was present under previous Kazakh rulers such as Abu'l-Mansur, and they sought to resist taxation by the Russians.

In 1841, the three khans obtained the help of their younger cousin Aziz id-Din Bahadur, the son of Kazakh commander Nasrullah Nauryzbai Bahadur and gathered a large troop of well-trained Kazakhs to resist the Russian army.  The Kazakhs captured a number of Kokand fortresses in Kazakhstan, including their former capital of Hazrat-e-Turkistan.  They decided to hide in the mountainous region near Lake Balkhash, but were taken by surprise when a Kyrgyz khan named Ormon Khan disclosed their whereabouts to Russian troops.  Gubaidullah, Sher Ghazi, and Kenesary were all captured and executed by Kyrgyz defectors who had been helping the Russians.  By the end of 1847, the Russian army had captured the Kazakh capitals of Hazrat-e-Turkistan and Syghanaq, abolishing the Kazakh Khanate as a whole.

1839: Failed attack on Khiva
In 1839, Russia attempted to conquer Khiva. The Russians under Vasily Perovsky marched around 5,000 men south from Orenburg. The winter was unusually cold and most of his camels died, forcing him to turn back. See Khivan campaign of 1839.

1847–1853: The Syr Darya line

Southward from the Siberian Line the obvious next step was a line of forts along the Syr Darya eastward from the Aral Sea. This brought Russia into conflict with the Khan of Kokand. In the early 19th century Kokand began expanding northwest from the Ferghana Valley. About 1814 they took Hazrat-i-Turkestan on the Syr Darya and around 1817 they built Ak-Mechet ('White Mosque') further downriver, as well as smaller forts on both sides of Ak-Mechet. The area was ruled by the Beg of Ak Mechet who taxed the local Kazakhs who wintered along the river and had recently driven the Karakalpaks southward.  In peacetime Ak-Mechet had a garrison of 50 and Julek 40. The Khan of Khiva had a weak fort on the lower part of the river.

Given Perovsky's failure in 1839 Russia decided on a slow but sure approach. In 1847 Captain Schultz built Raimsk in the Syr delta. It was soon moved upriver to Kazalinsk. Both places were also called Fort Aralsk. Raiders from Khiva and Kokand attacked the local Kazakhs near the fort and were driven off by the Russians. Three sailing ships were built at Orenburg, disassembled, carried across to steppe and rebuilt. They were used to map the lake. In 1852/3 two steamers were carried in pieces from Sweden and launched on the Aral Sea. The local saxaul proving impractical, they had to be fueled with anthracite brought from the Don. At other times a steamer would tow a barge-load of saxaul and periodically stop to reload fuel. The Syr proved to be shallow, full of sand bars and difficult to navigate during the spring flood.

In 1852 a surveying party went upriver and was turned back before reaching Ak-Mechet. That summer Colonel Blaramberg and about 400 men were sent to raze Ak-Mechet on the pretext that Russia owned the north side of the river.  The Kokandis responded by breaking the dykes and flooding the surrounding area. Having brought no scaling ladders or heavy artillery, Blaramberg saw that he could not take the citadel with its 25-foot-high walls.  He therefore captured the outworks, burnt everything in the area and retired to Fort Aralsk. The later-famous Yakub Beg had commanded the fort at one time, but it is not clear if he was in command during this first battle. Next summer the Russians assembled a force of over 2000 men, over 2000 each of horses, camels and oxen, 777 wagons, bridging timber, pontoons and the steamer Perovsky. To guarantee that there would be enough fodder to move this much from Orenburg to Fort Aralsk, the Kazakhs were forbidden to graze the lands north of the fort. Command was given to the same Perovsky who earlier had failed to reach Khiva. He left Aralsk in June and reached Ak-Mechet on July 2. The Kokandis had strengthened the fort and increased the garrison. A regular siege was begun. When the trenches neared the citadel, a mine was dug under the walls. At 3AM on 9 August 1853 the mine was exploded, creating a large breach. The breach was taken on the third try and by 4:30AM it was all over. 230 Kokandi bodies were counted out of the original 300-man garrison. The place was renamed Fort Perovsky.

During the siege Padurov went  upriver to Julek and found that its defenders had fled. He wrecked the fort as well as he could and returned with its abandoned guns.  In September a large force from Kokand reoccupied Julek and advanced toward Fort Perovsky. The column sent to meet them had a hard day's fight, called for reinforcements but next morning found that the Kokandis had retreated.  In December a Kokandi force (said to be 12000 men) surrounded Fort Perovsky. A 500-man sortie was soon surrounded and in trouble. Major Shkupa, seeing the enemy camp weakly defended, broke out and burned the camp. Two more sorties drove the Kokandis off in disorder.

Russia now held a  line of forts along the west-flowing part of the Syr Darya. The area between the Aral and Caspian Seas was too thinly-populated to matter. The next question was whether Russia would extend the line east to the mountains (Fort Vernoye was founded in 1854) or continue southeast up the river to Kokand and the Ferghana Valley.

1847–1864: Down the eastern side 

In 1847–1864 the Russians crossed the eastern Kazakh steppe and built a line of forts in the irrigated area along the northern Kyrgyz border. In 1864–68 they moved south, conquered Tashkent and Samarkand, confined the Khanate of Kokand to the Ferghana valley and made Bokhara a protectorate. This was the main event of the conquest. Our sources do not say why an eastern approach was chosen, but an obvious guess is that irrigation made it possible to move armies without crossing steppe or desert. This was important when transport required grass-fed horses and camels. We are not told how Russia supplied an army this far east, or if this was a problem. It is not clear why a forward policy was now adopted. It seems that different officials had different opinions and much was decided by local commanders and the luck of the battlefield. All sources report Russian victories over greatly superior forces with kill ratios approaching ten to one. Even if enemy numbers are exaggerated it seems clear that Russian weapons and tactics were now superior to the traditional Asian armies that they faced.  All sources mention breechloading rifles without further explanation. Berdan rifles are mentioned without giving numbers. MacGahan, in his account of the Khivan campaign, contrasts explosive artillery to traditional cannonballs. Artillery and rifles could often keep Russian soldiers out of reach of hand weapons.

Advance from the northeast (1847–1864): The eastern end of the Kazakh steppe was called Semirechye by the Russians. Water coming down from the mountains provides irrigation for a line of towns and supports a natural caravan route. South of this mountain projection is the densely-populated Ferghana Valley ruled by the Khanate of Kokand. South of Ferghana is the Turkestan Range and then the land the ancients called Bactria. West of the northern range is the great city of Tashkent and west of the southern range is Tamerlane's old capital Samarkand.

In 1847 Kopal was founded southeast of Lake Balkash. In 1852 Russia crossed the Ili River and met Kazakh resistance and next year destroyed the Kazakh fort of Tuchubek. In 1854 they founded Fort Vernoye (Almaty) within sight of the mountains. Eight years later, in 1862, Russia took Tokmak (Tokmok) and Pishpek (Bishkek). Russia placed a force at the Kastek pass to block a counterattack from Kokand. The Kokandis used a different pass, attacked an intermediate post, Kolpakovsky rushed from Kastek and completely defeated a much larger army. In 1864 Chernayev took command of the east, led 2500 men from Siberia, and captured Aulie-Ata (Taraz). Russia was now near the west end of the mountain range and about halfway between Vernoye and Ak-Mechet.

In 1851 Russia and China signed the Treaty of Kulja to regulate trade along what was becoming a new border. In 1864 they signed the Treaty of Tarbagatai which approximately established the current Chinese-Kazakh border. The Chinese thereby renounced any claims to the Kazakh steppe, to the extent that they had any.

Up the Syr Darya (1859–1864): Meanwhile, Russia was advancing southeast up the Syr Darya from Ak-Mechet. In 1859, Julek was taken from Kokand. In 1861 a Russian fort was built at Julek and Yani Kurgan (Zhanakorgan)  upriver was taken. In June 1864 Veryovkin took Hazrat-i-Turkestan from Kokand. He hastened surrender by bombarding the famous mausoleum. Two Russian columns met in the  gap between Hazrat and Aulie-Ata, thereby completing the Syr-Darya Line.

1864–1868: Kokand and Bukhara subdued

Chernayev easily took it on 3 October 1864. On 15 October he suddenly appeared before Tashkent, failed to take it by sudden assault and retreated to Chimkent. Kokand then tried and failed to re-take Hazrat-i-Turkestan. In April 1865 Chernayev made a second attack on Tashkent. Unable to take such a large place (it was said to have a garrison of 30,000) he occupied the town's water supply at Niazbek. The Kokand Regent Alim Kuli arrived with 6,000 more troops and almost defeated the Russians, but was killed in the fight. The inhabitants now offered to submit to the Emir of Bokhara in return for assistance. About 21 June a party of Bokharans entered the town and more Bokharan troops were on the move. In this critical position Chernayev determined to risk a storm. At 3 a.m. on 27 June, Captain Abramov scaled the wall and opened the Kamelan Gate, advanced along the wall and opened a second gate while another party took the Kokand gate. That day and the next there was constant street fighting, but on the morning of the 29th a deputation of elders offered surrender.

Campaign of 1866: The Bokhara was now involved in the war. In February 1866 Chernayev crossed the Hungry Steppe to the Bokharan fort of Jizzakh. Finding the task impossible, he withdrew to Tashkent followed by Bokharans who were soon joined by Kokandis. At this point Chernayev was recalled for insubordination and replaced by Romanovsky. Romanovsky prepared to attack Bohkara, the Amir moved first, the two forces met on the plain of Irjar. Note: Near Kattakurgan, Uzbekistan about halfway between Jizzakh and Bokhara. The Bukharians scattered, losing most of their artillery, supplies and treasures and more than 1,000 killed, while the Russians lost 12 wounded. Instead of following him, Romanovsky turned east and took Khujand, thus closing the mouth of the Fergana Valley. The losses of the Kokand residents were more than 2.5 thousand killed, 130 Russians killed and wounded. Then he moved west and took Ura-Tepe  and Jizzakh from Bukhara. During the capture of Jizzak, the Bukharians lost 6,000 killed and 3,000 prisoners, as well as all the artillery. In total, during the campaign of 1866, the Russian troops lost 500 people killed and wounded, while the natives lost more than 12,000 killed. Defeats forced Bukhara to start peace talks.

Samarkand (1868): In July 1867 a new Province of Turkestan was created and placed under General von Kaufmann with its headquarters at Tashkent. The Bokharan Amir did not fully control his subjects, there were random raids and rebellions, so Kaufmann decided to hasten matters by attacking Samarkand. After he dispersed a Bokharan force Samarkand closed its gates to the Bokharan army and surrendered (May 1868).  He left a garrison in Samarkand and left to deal with some outlying areas. The garrison was besieged and in great difficulty until Kaufmann returned. On June 2, 1868, in a decisive battle on the Zerabulak heights, the Russians defeated the main forces of the Bukhara Emir, losing less than 100 people, while the Bukhara army lost from 3.5 to 10,000. On 5 July 1868 a peace treaty was signed. The Khanate of Bokhara lost Samarkand and remained a semi-independent vassal until the revolution. The Khanate of Kokand had lost its western territory, was confined to the Ferghana valley and surrounding mountains and remained independent for about 10 years. According to the Bregel's Atlas, if nowhere else, in 1870 the now-vassal Khanate of Bokhara expanded east and annexed that part of Bactria enclosed by the Turkestan Range, the Pamir plateau and the Afghan border.

1875–1876: Liquidation of the Kokand Khanate
In 1875 the Kokand Khanate rebelled against Russian rule. Kokand commanders Abdurakhman and Pulat bey seized power in the khanate and began military operations against the Russians. By July 1875 most of the Khan's army and much of his family had deserted to the rebels, so he fled to the Russians at Kojent along with a million British pounds of treasure. Kaufmann invaded the Khanate on September 1, fought several battles and entered the capital on September 10, 1875. In October he transferred command to Mikhail Skobelev.  Russian troops under the command of Skobelev and Kaufmann defeated the rebels at the Battle of Makhram. In 1876, the Russians freely entered Kokand, the leaders of the rebels were executed, and the khanate was abolished. Fergana Oblast was created in its place.

The Caspian side

Russia now held an approximately triangular area bounded by the eastern mountains and the vassal Khanate of Bokhara along most of the Oxus. The next step was to turn this triangle into a rectangle by moving east across the Caspian Sea from the Caucasus. The Caucasus held many troops left over from the Russian conquest of the Caucasus but the Viceroy of the Caucasus had so far not been active in Turkestan. The Caucasus has a fairly dense population but the east side of the Caspian is desert with significant population only in the oases of Khiva and along the Kopet Dag and at Merv in the south. The main events were the defeat of Khiva in 1873, the conquest of the Turkomans in 1881, the annexation of Merv in 1884 and the Panjdeh area in 1885.

For reference, these were the Russian bases on the north and east side of the Caspian: 
Astrakhan (1556–): at the mouth of the Volga River with connections to the rest of Russia
Guryev (1645–): a small place at the mouth of the Ural River
Novo-Aleksandrovsky (1834–1846): a shallow port, overlooking Dead Kultuk Bay, that was soon abandoned as the local climate was too inhospitable
Alexandrovsk (1846–): important at this time but not later
Kenderli (?1873): a temporary base
Krasnovodsk (1869–) the best port and later headquarters of the Transcaspian Oblast and start of the Trans-Caspian railway
Chikishlyar (1871–?): a beach rather than a port 
Ashuradeh (1837–?) a fort and naval station on land claimed by Persia.

1873: The conquest of Khiva

The decision to attack Khiva was made in December 1872. Khiva was an oasis surrounded by several hundred kilometres of desert. The Russians could easily defeat the Khivan army if they could move enough troops across the desert. The place was attacked from five directions. Kaufmann marched west from Tashkent and was joined by another army coming south from Aralsk. They met in the desert, ran short of water, abandoned part of their supplies and reached the Oxus in late May. Veryovkin left from Orenburg, had little difficulty moving along the west side of the Aral Sea and reached the northwest corner of the delta in mid-May. He was joined by Lomakin who had a hard time crossing the desert from the Caspian. Markozov started from Chikishlyar, ran short of water and was forced to turn back. Kaufmann crossed the Oxus, fought a few easy battles and on June 4 the Khan sued for peace. Meanwhile, Veryovkin, who was out of contact with Kaufmann, crossed the delta and attacked the city walls of Khiva until he was called off by Kaufmann. The Khanate of Khiva became a Russian protectorate and remained so until the Russian Revolution.

1879–1885: Turkmenistan: Geok Tepe, Merv and Panjdeh

The Turkoman country remained unconquered. The area corresponded to the Karakum Desert and was inhabited by the Turkoman desert nomads. Irrigation supported a settled population along the Amu Darya in the northeast and along the north slope of the Kopet Dag mountains in the southwest. East of the Kopet Dag two rivers, the Murghab and Tejen, flow north from Afghanistan, supporting the oases of Tejen and Merv. The semi-sedentary population would drive their flocks out into the desert in spring and fall. The Turkomans had no organized state. Some served as mercenaries for Khiva. They habitually raided Persia and sold the resulting slaves in the Khiva slave market. They also bred desert-adapted horses that could usually outrun anything the Cossacks had. Unlike the rather antiquated armies of the Khanates, the Turkomans were good raiders and horsemen, but they could do little against the Russians' modern weapons and explosive artillery. As usual, the main problem was moving men and supplies across the desert.

1879: Lomakin's defeat at Geok Tepe: Lazarev landed a large force at Chikishlyar and began moving men and supplies up the Atrek River. He died suddenly and Lomakin took command. Lomakin crossed the Kopet Dagh with too few men, made an incompetent attack on Geok Tepe and was forced to retreat. The warlike Teke put up resistance Russian observers assessed as "worthy of the best European armies," proof of that being the heavy losses, over 25 percent, the Russians suffered in combat. Russian officers additionally noted that the Turkmen position was "fortified in an exemplary manner, according to all the rules of modern fortification."

1881: Skobelev's bloody victory at Geok Tepe: Skobelev was put in command in March 1880. He spent most of the summer and fall moving men and supplies from Chikishlyar to the north side of the Kopet Dag. In December he marched southwest, besieged Geok Tepe for a month and took it by detonating a mine to breach the wall. At least 14,000 Tekes were killed. In May 1881 the occupied area was annexed as the Transcaspian Oblast. The eastern boundary of the oblast was undefined.

1884: The annexation of Merv: The Trans-Caspian Railway reached Kyzyl Arbat at the northwest end of the Kopet Dag in mid-September 1881. From October through December Lessar surveyed the north side of the Kopet Dag and reported that there would be no problem building a railway along it. From April 1882 he examined the country almost to Herat and reported that were no military obstacles between the Kopet Dag and Afghanistan. Nazirov or Nazir Beg went to Merv in disguise and then crossed the desert to Bukhara and Tashkent.

The irrigated area along the Kopet Dag ends east of Ashkebat. Farther east there is desert, then the small oasis of Tejent, more desert, and the much larger oasis of Merv. Merv had the great fortress of Kaushut Khan and was inhabited by Merv Tekes, who had also fought at Geok Tepe. As soon as the Russians were established in Askhabad, traders, and also spies, began moving between the Kopet Dag and Merv. Some elders from Merv went north to Petroalexandrovsk and offered a degree of submission to the Russians there. The Russians at Askhabad had to explain that both groups were part of the same empire. In February 1882 Alikhanov visited Merv and approached Makhdum Kuli Khan, who had been in command at Geok Tepe. In September Alikhanov persuaded Makhdum Kuli Khan to swear allegiance to the White Czar.

Skobelev had been replaced by Rohrberg in the spring of 1881, who was followed General Komarov in the spring of 1883. Near the end of 1883, General Komarov led 1500 men to occupy the Tejen oasis. After Komarov's occupation of Tejen, Alikhanov and Makhdum Kuli Khan went to Merv and called a meeting of elders, one threatening and the other persuading. Having no wish to repeat the slaughter at Geok Tepe, 28 elders went to Askhabad and on February 12 swore allegiance in the presence of General Komarov.  A faction in Merv tried to resist but was too weak to accomplish anything.  On March 16, 1884, Komarov occupied Merv. The subject Khanates of Khiva and Bukhara were now surrounded by Russian territory.

South of that is the important border fort of Herat. In the summer of 1884 Britain and Russia agreed to demarcate the northwest Afghan border. The Russians did what they could to push the border south before it became frozen. When they captured the Afghan fort of Panjdeh, Britain came close to threatening war. Both sides backed down and the border was delineated between 1885 and 1886.

Cost: Russian military expense records indicate that between 1869 and 1879 the Transcaspian campaign cost 4.8 million rubles, the 1879–1880 expedition 5.525 million rubles, and the 1880–1881 expedition 11 million rubles. Railroad construction to that point cost 4,429,991 rubles, and construction materials another 3.518 million rubles. Total expenses from 1869 to 1881 amounted to 29,274,991 rubles.

1872–1895: The Eastern Mountains 
The natural eastern boundary of Russian Turkestan was the eastern mountains, but the exact line had to be settled. There were four main problems.

1867–1877: Yakub Beg: East of the Feghana Valley and southeast of Fort Vernoye on the other side of the mountains is the oval Tarim Basin which had belonged to China since 1759. During the Dungan Revolt (1862–77) China lost partial control of its western territories. A man named Yakub Beg made himself master of Kashgar and most of the Tarim Basin. Kaufmann twice thought of attacking him. In 1872 forces were massed on the border but this was called off because of the impending war against Khiva.  In 1875 more serious plans were made. A mission was sent to the Khan of Kokand to ask permission to move forces through his domains. A revolt broke out and the Russian troops were used instead to annex Kokand (see below).  In 1877 China re-conquered the Tarim Basin and Yakub Beg was killed.

1871–1883: temporary occupation of Kulja: The Tien Shan mountains run along the northern border of Kyrgyzstan. They continue east and separate Dzungaria in the north from the Tarim Basin in the south. On the Chinese side the Borohoro Mountains branch off creating the upper Ili River valley with its capital of Kulja (modern Yining City).  Although normally part of Dzungaria the valley opens out onto the Russian-controlled steppe.  In 1866 the Dungans captured Kulja and massacred its inhabitants.  They soon began fighting with the Taranchis (Uigurs) who soon became dominant. In 1870 it appeared that Yakub Beg might move on Kulja so Kaufmann occupied the Muzart Pass. In June 1871 General Kolpakovsky crossed the border and occupied Kulja (4 July 1871).  Some talked of permanent occupation but the Russian Foreign Office told the Chinese that the province would be returned as soon as the Emperor could send enough troops to maintain order. In 1877 China regained control of Chinese Turkestan and requested the return of Kulja.  In September 1879 the Chinese ambassador concluded a treaty at Livadia but his government rejected it.  This was replaced by the more favorable Treaty of Saint Petersburg (1881). Russia finally evacuated Kulja in the spring of 1883.  There were the usual border disputes and an additional protocol was signed at Chuguchak (Tacheng?) on October 19, 1883. The re-occupation of Kulja was one of the few Chinese successes against a Western power during the nineteenth century.

1893: Pamirs occupied:   The southeast corner of Russian Turkestan was the high Pamirs which is now the Gorno-Badakhshan Autonomous Region  of Tajikistan.  The high plateaus on the east are used for summer pasture. On the west side difficult gorges run down to the Panj river and Bactria. In 1871 Alexei Pavlovich Fedchenko  got the Khan's permission to explore southward. He reached the Alay Valley but his escort would not permit him to go south onto the Pamir plateau.  In 1876 Skobelev chased a rebel south to the Alay Valley and Kostenko went over the Kyzylart Pass and mapped the area around Karakul Lake on the northeast part of the plateau. In the next 20 years most of the area was mapped.  In 1891 the Russians informed Francis Younghusband that he was on their territory and later escorted a Lieutenant Davidson out of the area ('Pamir Incident'). In 1892 a battalion of Russians under Mikhail Ionov entered the area and camped near the present Murghab, Tajikistan in the northeast. Next year they built a proper fort there (Pamirskiy Post). In 1895 their base was moved west to Khorog facing the Afghans. In 1893 the Durand Line established the Wakhan Corridor between the Russian Pamirs and British India.

The Great Game

The Great Game refers to British attempts to block Russian expansion southeast toward British India. Although there was much talk of a possible Russian invasion of India and a number of British agents and adventurers penetrated central Asia, the British did nothing serious to prevent the Russian conquest of Turkestan, with one exception.  Whenever Russian agents approached Afghanistan they reacted very strongly, seeing Afghanistan as a necessary buffer state for the defense of India.

A Russian invasion of India seems improbable, but a number of British writers considered how it might be done. When little was known about the geography it was thought that they could reach Khiva and sail up the Oxus to Afghanistan.  More realistically they might gain Persian support and cross northern Persia. Once in Afghanistan they would swell their armies with offers of loot and invade India. Alternatively, they might invade India and provoke a native rebellion.  The goal would probably not be the conquest of India but to put pressure on the British while Russia did something more important such as taking Constantinople.

In 1801 there was some loose talk of a joint Franco-Russian invasion of India. During the Russo-Persian War (1804–13) both British and French agents were active in Persia, their goals varying depending on which power was allied with Russia at the time. In 1810 Charles Christie and Henry Pottinger crossed western Afghanistan and eastern Persia.  Christie was killed in 1812 supporting the Persians at the Battle of Aslanduz. In 1819 Muraviev reached Khiva.  A Russian mission reached Bokhara in 1820. In 1825 Moorcroft reached Bukhara.  In 1830 Arthur Conolly tried to reach Khiva from Persia but was turned back by bandits and continued on to Herat and British India.  In 1832 Alexander Burnes reached Bokhara.

The period from 1837 to 1842 was especially active. In 1839,  at the time of Perovsky's failed attack on Khiva, Abbot went to Khiva to negotiate the release of Russian slaves held there in order to remove a pretext for the invasion. He failed.  Next year Richmond Shakespear went after him, was successful, and led 416 Russian slaves to the Caspian. In 1837 Jan Prosper Witkiewicz reached Kabul.  In 1838 Persia besieged Herat, with British and Russian agents supporting the two sides. Britain ended the siege by occupying a Persian island.  In 1838 Charles Stoddart went to Bokhara and was arrested. In 1841 Arthur Conolly went to secure his release and both were executed in 1842. During the First Anglo-Afghan War (1839–42) Britain invaded Afghanistan, was driven out, re-invaded and withdrew.

The British took Sindh in 1843 and Punjab in 1849, thereby gaining the Indus River and a border with Afghanistan. The Crimean War occurred in 1853–56. A second Persian attack on Herat led to the Anglo-Persian War of 1856–57. The Indian Mutiny occurred in 1857–58. This was about the time Russian was building forts east from the Aral Sea (1847–53).  The Russian capture of Tashkent (1865) and Samarkand(1868) produced no British response.

In 1875, following the conquest of Khiva, Frederick Gustavus Burnaby rode from Orenburg to Khiva, an event that was only important because of his widely-read book.  Kaufmann's intrigues in Kabul provoked the Second Anglo-Afghan War of 1878–80. During the second battle of Geok Tepe Colonel Charles Stewart was on the south side of the mountain doing something that has never been clarified.
 
On the Chinese side of the mountains a line of passes corresponding the Karakoram Highway provided a trade and pilgrim route from the Tarim Basin to India. It was not clear whether this could be used by an army. At the time of Yakub Beg both Russian and British agents were active at his court. A number of Indians in the British service mapped the area around the Pamirs. Russian expansion in the Pamirs provoked the British to move northward and gain control of places like Hunza and Chitral.

The Great Game came to an end with the demarcation of the northern Afghan border in 1886 and 1893 and the Anglo-Russian Entente of 1907.

In contemporary culture
The Japanese manga A Bride's Story, written by Kaoru Mori, takes time during the Russian conquest in Central Asia.

Notes

Citations

References and further reading

Bregel, Yuri. An Historical Atlas of Central Asia, 2003.
 Brower, Daniel.  Turkestan and the Fate of the Russian Empire (London) 2003
 Curzon, G.N. Russia in Central Asia (London) 1889 online free
Ewans, Martin. Securing the Indian frontier in Central Asia: Confrontation and negotiation, 1865–1895 (Routledge, 2010).
Hopkirk, Peter. The Great Game: The Struggle for Empire in Central Asia, John Murray, 1990.

Johnson, Robert. Spying for empire: the great game in Central and South Asia, 1757–1947 (Greenhill Books/Lionel Leventhal, 2006).
Malikov, A.M. The Russian conquest of the Bukharan emirate: military and diplomatic aspects in Central Asian Survey, volume 33, issue 2, 2014.
Mancall, Mark. Russia and China: Their Diplomatic Relations to 1728, Harvard University press, 1971.
McKenzie, David. The Lion of Tashkent: The Career of General M. G. Cherniaev, University of Georgia Press, 1974.
Middleton, Robert and Huw Thomas. Tajikistan and the High Pamirs, Odyssey Books, 2008.
 Morris, Peter. "The Russians in Central Asia, 1870–1887." Slavonic and East European Review 53.133 (1975): 521–538 online.
Morrison, Alexander. "Introduction: Killing the Cotton Canard and getting rid of the Great Game: rewriting the Russian conquest of Central Asia, 1814–1895." (2014): 131–142. online
Morrison, Alexander. Russian rule in Samarkand 1868–1910: A comparison with British India (Oxford UP, 2008).
Peyrouse, Sébastien. "Nationhood and the minority question in Central Asia. The Russians in Kazakhstan." Europe–Asia Studies 59.3 (2007): 481–501.
 Pierce, Richard A. Russian Central Asia, 1867–1917: a study in colonial rule (1960) online free to borrow
Quested, Rosemary. The expansion of Russia in East Asia, 1857–1860 (University of Malaya Press, 1968).
Saray, Mehmet. "The Russian conquest of central Asia." Central Asian Survey 1.2-3 (1982): 1–30.
 Schuyler, Eugene.  Turkistan (London) 1876 2 Vols. online free
Skrine, Francis Henry, The Heart of Asia, circa 1900.
Spring, Derek W. "Russian imperialism in Asia in 1914." Cahiers du monde russe et soviétique (1979): 305–322 online
Sunderland, Willard. "The Ministry of Asiatic Russia: the colonial office that never was but might have been." Slavic Review (2010): 120–150 online.
Valikhanov, Chokan Chingisovich, Mikhail Ivanovich Venyukov, and Other Travelers. The Russians in Central Asia: Their Occupation of the Kirghiz Steppe and the line of the Syr-Daria: Their Political Relations with Khiva, Bokhara, and Kokan: Also Descriptions of Chinese Turkestan and Dzungaria, Edward Stanford, 1865.
 Wheeler, Geoffrey. The Russians in Central Asia History Today. March 1956, 6#3 pp 172–180. 
 Wheeler, Geoffrey. The modern history of Soviet Central Asia  (1964). online free to borrow
Williams, Beryl. "Approach to the Second Afghan War: Central Asia during the Great Eastern Crisis, 1875–1878." 'International History Review 2.2 (1980): 216–238.
Yapp, M. E. Strategies of British India. Britain, Iran and Afghanistan, 1798–1850'' (Oxford: Clarendon Press 1980)

Central Asia in the Russian Empire
Wars involving Russia
19th-century military history of the Russian Empire
Territorial evolution of Russia
Russian military occupations